Glenn Henry Hall (born October 3, 1931) is a Canadian former professional ice hockey goaltender. During his National Hockey League career with the Detroit Red Wings, Chicago Black Hawks, and St. Louis Blues, Hall seldom missed a game and was a consistent performer, winning the Vezina Trophy, which at the time was awarded to the goaltender on the team allowing the fewest goals against (a distinction that now results in being awarded the William M. Jennings Trophy), three times, being voted the First team All-Star goaltender a record seven times, and winning the Calder Memorial Trophy as best rookie. Nicknamed "Mr. Goalie", he was the first goaltender to develop and make effective use of the butterfly style of goalkeeping. In 2017 Hall was named one of the 100 Greatest NHL Players in history. He is the grandfather of Grant Stevenson.

Professional playing career

Detroit Red Wings
After finishing his junior years playing for the Humboldt Indians and the Windsor Spitfires, he signed with the Detroit Red Wings in 1949. The first few years of his NHL career were spent playing in Detroit's minor system. In the 1952 playoffs he was called up from the minors to be the backup goalie in the finals, but did not play for Detroit. Detroit still put Hall's name on the Stanley Cup, before he had played his first NHL game. He finally made the Red Wings' lineup as their starting goalie in the 1955–56 season, displacing Terry Sawchuk. Hall played in every game of his first full season with the Red Wings, recording twelve shutouts, winning the Calder Memorial Trophy as rookie of the year and being voted the Second Team All-Star goaltender. He seemed erratic during the Stanley Cup Finals against Montreal.

Chicago Black Hawks

During his second full season with Detroit, he again played every game and was voted as the First Team All-Star goaltender, which since the Vezina Trophy was automatically awarded to the goaltenders on the team allowing the fewest goals, was essentially being named the best goaltender in the league.  Despite this, at season's end he found himself traded to the Chicago Black Hawks along with NHL Players' Association co-organizer Ted Lindsay. Hall continued his stellar play in the Windy City, playing every regular-season game as well as every playoff game. In 1961, Hall backstopped the Black Hawks to their first Stanley Cup Championship since 1938 over Detroit. On November 7, 1962, the record streak finally came to an end against the Boston Bruins, as Hall had back problems. Denis DeJordy replaced him during the game. Hall managed to play 502 consecutive complete games, which spanned eight seasons, an NHL record for goaltenders that is unlikely to be broken. He never wore a goaltending mask or helmet during the streak, only doing so late in his career, which will be an unbreakable record as the mask has now become a mandatory piece of equipment.  It is rumoured that Hall threw up before each game, then drank a glass of orange juice.  During his time in Chicago he was voted the First Team All-Star goaltender five times and the Second Team All-Star goaltender three times.

Later success
Despite winning the Vezina Trophy in 1966–67, the 36-year old Hall was left unprotected for that summer's NHL expansion draft and was chosen by the St. Louis Blues. One of six expansion franchises in their first year in the league, the Blues stocked themselves with veteran talent, including Red Berenson and Phil Goyette, and won the West Division Playoffs in two seven-game series. Hall's play led them all the way to the Stanley Cup Final. Most hockey fans expected an utter rout when the established Canadiens faced the 1st-year expansion Blues. But this was Hall's fourth trip to the finals, and his goaltending was the most outstanding contribution to the surprisingly good performance of the Blues against the Montreal Canadiens. The Blues lost the best-of-seven series getting swept 4–0,  but in 4 exciting 1-goal games (3–2 (OT), 1–0. 4–3 (OT), and 3–2). Hall's remarkable play was recognized by being awarded the Conn Smythe Trophy as the playoffs' Most Valuable Player, an award rarely going to a player from a losing team. ‘Even though we lost to the Canadiens in a sweep, I don’t feel it tainted my winning the Smythe one bit’, said Hall. ‘The odds were heavily stacked against us right from the start.’

In 1968, veteran goaltending legend Jacques Plante joined the Blues, sharing duties with Hall. The two put together a fine season in 1968–69, winning the Vezina Trophy, and setting a then-Blues' record of 13 shutouts.  Hall was voted the First Team All-Star goaltender emblematic of being the best goaltender in the league, his record seventh selection as such.

Retirement

He had retired after the 1968–69 season, but Hall came out of retirement to play 18 games in 1969–70 season. He was in goal when the Boston Bruins' Bobby Orr scored the Stanley Cup-clinching goal in game 4 of the 1970 Finals after only 40 seconds of overtime.

Hall's career ended after the 1970–71 season when he announced his retirement at the age of 39. In 1975 he was elected to the Hockey Hall of Fame. Hall won his third Stanley Cup as the goaltending coach with Calgary Flames in 1989.

Legacy
Hall ended his career with 407 wins, 84 shutouts, a career GAA of 2.49, and was voted to eleven All-Star Games. Hall is widely regarded as one of the first NHL goalies to master the butterfly style of goaltending. He is thought of by many as one of the best goalies to ever play the game. Hall still holds the record for the most First Team All-Star selections (7) which he achieved while playing the same era as other greats, Sawchuk and Plante—as well as other Hall of Famers, such as Johnny Bower and Gump Worsley.

In 1998, he was ranked number 16 on The Hockey News''' list of the 100 Greatest Hockey Players, currently the highest rank for a living former goaltender (No. 13-ranked Jacques Plante died in 1986, and No. 9 Terry Sawchuk in 1970).

In 2005, the City of Humboldt, Saskatchewan erected a permanent monument to Hall's career in Glenn Hall Park on Highway #5 (Glenn Hall Drive). The tribute included highlights of his career from his junior days in Humboldt until his retirement from the NHL.

Awards and achievements
 Calder Memorial Trophy Winner in 1956.
 Played in 1955, 1956, 1957, 1958, 1960, 1961, 1962, 1963, 1964, 1965, 1967, 1968, and 1969 NHL All-Star Games.
 Selected to the NHL first All-Star team in 1957, 1958, 1960, 1963, 1964, 1966, and 1969.
 Selected to the NHL second All-Star team in 1956, 1961, 1962, and 1967.
 Vezina Trophy Winner in 1963, 1967, and 1969.
 Conn Smythe Trophy Winner in 1968.
 Stanley Cup Championship in 1961, and 1989 (as goaltender coach).
 Holds NHL record for most consecutive games started by a goaltender with 502 games.
 Inducted into the Hockey Hall of Fame in 1975.
 In 1998, he was ranked number 16 on The Hockey News''' list of the 100 Greatest Hockey Players.
 In January, 2017, Hall was part of the first group of players to be named one of the '100 Greatest NHL Players' in history.

Career statistics

Regular season and playoffs

* Stanley Cup Champion.

See also
Butterfly style
List of NHL goaltenders with 300 wins

References

External links

Glenn Hall biography
Profile of Mr. Goalie at The Hockey Writers

1931 births
Calder Trophy winners
Calgary Flames coaches
Canadian ice hockey goaltenders
Chicago Blackhawks players
Conn Smythe Trophy winners
Detroit Red Wings players
Edmonton Flyers (WHL) players
Edmonton Oilers coaches
Hockey Hall of Fame inductees
Sportspeople from Humboldt, Saskatchewan
Indianapolis Capitals players
Living people
National Hockey League All-Stars
National Hockey League players with retired numbers
St. Louis Blues players
Stanley Cup champions
Vezina Trophy winners
Windsor Spitfires players
Ice hockey people from Saskatchewan
Canadian ice hockey coaches